Tomis Kapitan (1949-2016) was an American philosopher and Distinguished Teaching Professor Emeritus at Northern Illinois University.  He worked primarily in metaphysics and philosophy of language.  Kapitan was especially interested in the free will debate, where he was a "compatibilist," defending the view that free will is possible even in a completely deterministic universe.  He also published in philosophy of religion and wrote extensively on the Palestine-Israeli conflict.

Books
 The Israeli-Palestinian Conflict: Philosophical Essays on Self-Determination, Terrorism and the One-State Solution, with Raja Halwani Springer 2007
 The Phenomeno-Logic of the I: Essays on Self-Consciousness
 Archaeology, History and Culture in Palestine and the Near East: essays in memory of Albert E Glock

References

21st-century American philosophers
Philosophy academics
1949 births
2016 deaths
Northern Illinois University faculty
Indiana University Bloomington alumni